Teakettle is a settlement in the Cayo District of Belize in Central America. According to the 2010 census, Teakettle had a population of 1,747 people in 360 households.

History 
On 28 October 2011 eleven students mysteriously fell ill during school and were transported to the Western Regional Hospital in Belmopan.  Doctors have not found out the origin of the illness.

Location and geographic setting 
Teakettle is situated on the George Price Highway five miles west of Belmopan.

Climate 
Teakettle has a tropical climate, with little temperature difference between seasons, but a pronounced rainy season.

References 

Populated places in Cayo District
Cayo South